The Avro 560  was a British single-engined ultralight monoplane built by Avro at Hamble Aerodrome.

Design and development
The Avro 560 was designed for the 1923 light aircraft trials for single-seaters at Lympne Aerodrome. The Avro 560 was an ultralight built of wood-and-fabric construction, a cantilever high-wing monoplane. It was powered by a 698 cc (42.6 in³ Blackburne Tomtit engine. The aircraft was flown by Bert Hinkler during the trials held in October 1923; the 560 did well and recorded an average of 63.3 mi (101.9 km) per Imp gal (4.5 L). The aircraft was evaluated by the Air Ministry after the trials but was not chosen for further production and only one 560 was built.

Operators

Air Ministry

Specifications

See also

References

External links

Avro 560 – British Aircraft Directory

1920s British civil utility aircraft
560
High-wing aircraft
Single-engined tractor aircraft
Aircraft first flown in 1923